Horace White Wilkie (January 9, 1917May 23, 1976) was an American attorney, judge, and Democratic politician from the U.S. state of Wisconsin.  He was the 21st Chief Justice of the Wisconsin Supreme Court (1974–1976) and served a total of 14 years on the court (1962–1976).  Before being appointed to the Court, he served five years in the Wisconsin State Senate, representing Madison, Wisconsin.

Biography
Born in Madison, Wisconsin, Wilkie graduated from what is now the University of Wisconsin–Madison and received his law degree from George Washington University. During World War II, Wilkie served in the United States Coast Guard. After the war, he helped revive the Democratic Party of Wisconsin with other young liberals and former members of the Wisconsin Progressive Party in what was known as the Democratic Organizing Committee.  He ran for Congress three times in 1948, 1950, and 1952.  In 1956, Wilkie was elected to the Wisconsin State Senate. In 1962, he was appointed to the Wisconsin Supreme Court and in 1974, became chief justice of the court, serving until his death. Wilkie died of a heart attack in Pittsburgh, Pennsylvania, in 1976.

An odd coincidence of Justice Wilkie's career is that his successors in the Wisconsin State Senate and Wisconsin Supreme Court both became the longest-serving members of those respective bodies.  Fred A. Risser, who succeeded him in the Senate, served from 1962 through 2021.  Shirley Abrahamson, who succeeded him on the Wisconsin Supreme Court, served from 1976 through 2019. She died on December 19, 2020 in Berkeley, California.

References

Politicians from Madison, Wisconsin
University of Wisconsin–Madison alumni
George Washington University Law School alumni
Democratic Party Wisconsin state senators
Chief Justices of the Wisconsin Supreme Court
Military personnel from Madison, Wisconsin
United States Coast Guard personnel of World War II
1917 births
1976 deaths
20th-century American judges
20th-century American politicians